Baltimax is a naval architecture term for the largest ship measurements capable of entering and leaving the Baltic Sea in a laden condition.

It is the Great Belt route that allows the largest ships. The limit is a draft of 15.4 metres and an air draft of 65 metres (limited by the clearance of the east bridge of the Great Belt Fixed Link). The length can be around 240 m and the width around 42 m. This gives a weight of around 100,000 metric ton.

Nevertheless, there are also certain larger ship types plying the Baltic Sea. Particularly the so-called B-Max crude oil tanker with more than 205,000 tons deadweight (68 m width, 325 m length) and the Maersk Triple E class container ship, 400 m length and 165,000 metric tons deadweight.

The Öresund allows only 8 m draft and is no alternative for large ships. The shortcut Nord-Ostsee-Kanal allows 9.5 m draft.

Furthermore, many ports limit ship size. The iron ore ports of Luleå (11 m, to be deepened to 13 m) and Kemi (10 m) and the large port of Klaipėda (13.8 m) have less draft than Baltimax. The largest port is Primorsk which has 15 m draft, similar to Baltimax. The Northern Port in Gdańsk can take the 300,000 ton 15 m draft ships.

See also 
 Ports of the Baltic Sea

References 

Ship measurements
Ship types
Baltic Sea